Dick Turpin is a 1925 American silent historical adventure film directed by John G. Blystone produced and distributed by Fox Film Corporation and starring western hero Tom Mix. Mix departs from his usual western roles to play a British historical figure, the highwayman Dick Turpin (1705-1739). A young Carole Lombard was filmed in several scenes which mostly ended up on the cutting room floor.

Plot
As described in a review in a film magazine, several hundred years ago in England there was a famous highwayman, Dick Turpin (Mix), who preyed upon the rich and helped the poor. One day he encountered Lord Churlton (McCullough) and, a little later, in aiding a coach attacked by ruffians, he finds it contains Lady Brookfield (Myers). She tells him that she must marry Lord Churlton. Dick discloses his identity and offers to aid her. Arriving at the inn, Dick sees Lady Alice dress in men's clothes and sneak out while he escapes after a daring running fight with the guards. They journey to London. Lord Churlton follows and, when capture seems near, Dick disguises himself as a fighter and goes into the ring. As the guards close in, he again escapes by throwing the prize money to the rabble. In the forest he declares his love for Alice. A poor woman appears who asks for his aid, and he discovers himself surrounded by guards. Taken to prison, he is condemned to death. At the scaffold he finds his friend, Tom King (Hale), has taken the place of the hangman. Tom tells him that the crowd is with him and to take a break for his liberty. He escapes on his famous horse, Black Bess, and immediately starts out for York to aid Lady Alice. For days the guards keep up the pursuit, one by one giving out, until the last one succumbs near the journey's end. Dick arrives just in time to save Lady Alice. The two escape to France. Dick gives up his life on the road and the two find happiness.

Cast

Preservation
Prints of Dick Turpin are located in the George Eastman House Motion Picture Collection, Cinemateket-Svenska filminstitutet (Stockholm), and two different versions in the UCLA Film and Television Archive.

See also
Tom Mix filmography

References

External links

1925 films
1920s historical adventure films
American historical adventure films
Fox Film films
American silent feature films
Films directed by John G. Blystone
Films set in England
Films set in the 18th century
American black-and-white films
Cultural depictions of Dick Turpin
Films about highwaymen
1920s American films
Silent historical adventure films
1920s English-language films